The 2006 California lieutenant gubernatorial election occurred on November 7, 2006.  Insurance Commissioner John Garamendi, the Democratic nominee, narrowly defeated the Republican nominee, State Senator Tom McClintock, to succeed incumbent Cruz Bustamante, who was term-limited and ran for Insurance Commissioner.

Primary results
The primary elections took place on June 6. A bar graph of statewide results in this contest are available at https://web.archive.org/web/20070517094419/http://primary2006.ss.ca.gov/Returns/ltg/00.htm.

Results by county are available here and here.

Democratic

Candidates 

 John Garamendi, Incumbent Insurance Commissioner, and candidate for governor in 1982, 1994, and 2003
 Jackie Speier, State Senator
 Liz Figueroa, State Senator

Republican

Others

Results

Results by county
Results from the Secretary of State of California:

See also
2006 California elections
State of California
Lieutenant Governor of California
List of Lieutenant Governors of California

References

External links
VoteCircle.com Non-partisan resources & vote sharing network for Californians
Information on the elections from California's Secretary of State 
Official Homepage of the Lieutenant Governor of California

2006 California elections
California
2006